Ian Clement Roberts (born 29 April 1948) is a former English cricketer. Roberts was a right-handed batsman bowled right-arm medium-fast. He was born in Plymouth, Devon.

Roberts made his debut for Devon in the 1974 Minor Counties Championship against Berkshire. From 1974 to 1980, he represented the county in 26 Championship matches, the last of which came against Oxfordshire. He also represented Devon in a single List A match, at a time when they were permitted to take part in the domestic one-day competition, against Cornwall in the 1980 Gillette Cup 1st round. He wasn't required to bat in the match and with the ball he bowled 7 wicket-less overs.

References

External links
Ian Roberts at ESPNcricinfo
Ian Roberts at CricketArchive

1948 births
Living people
Cricketers from Plymouth, Devon
English cricketers
Devon cricketers